The Lake Brochu is a vast expanse of freshwater in the south-eastern part of the Gouin Reservoir, in the territory of the town of La Tuque, in the administrative region of Mauricie, in the province of Quebec, in Canada.

This lake extends into the townships of Brochu, Déziel, Nevers, Aubin and Brochu. Following the erection completed in 1948 of the Gouin Dam, the current form of "Brochu Lake" was shaped by the raising of the Gouin Reservoir.

Recreotourism activities are the main economic activity of the sector. Forestry comes second.

Some secondary forest roads are in use nearby for forestry and recreational tourism activities.

The surface of Brochu Lake is usually frozen from mid-November to the end of April, however, safe ice circulation is generally from early December to the end of March.

Geography

Toponymy
This hydronym, which was formalized in 1935 by the Quebec Geographical Commission, evokes the work of life of Michel-Delphis Brochu (Saint-Lazare-de-Bellechasse, Quebec, 1853 - Quebec, 1933), doctor and professor at the Faculty of Medicine of Laval University. Aliéniste, Brochu acts at the beginning of the twentieth century as general director of the asylum of Beauport, establishment named afterwards "Hospital Saint-Michel-Archangel", then designated "Hospital Center Robert-Giffard" (French: Centre hospitalier Robert-Giffard) which is named today Institut universitaire en santé mentale de Québec (French). He is also known to have been the promoter of the First Congress of French-Speaking Doctors in America held in Quebec City, at Château Frontenac, in 1902, as well as the first president of the Association of French-Speaking Doctors of North America.

The toponym "Lac Brochu" was formalized on December 18, 1986, by the Commission de toponymie du Québec.

Notes and references

See also 

Saint-Maurice River, a watercourse
Gouin Reservoir, a body of water
Kikendatch Bay, a body of water
Jean-Pierre Bay (Gouin Reservoir), a body of water
La Tuque, a city
List of lakes in Canada

Lakes of Mauricie
La Tuque, Quebec